Pewaukee is a village in Waukesha County, Wisconsin, United States. The population was 8,238 at the 2020 census. The village is nearly surrounded by the City of Pewaukee. The village was incorporated from what was formerly the Town of Pewaukee, and the remainder of the town later incorporated as a city.

History
The present-day village of Pewaukee was settled in about 1837 by the Deacon Asa Clark of Lunenburg, Vermont, when he erected a hotel, sawmill, and church in this location. Pewaukee became a town in the year 1840, and then a village later in 1876.

Pewaukee is constructed upon aki or (w)aukee, which means "land" or "location" in several Algonquian languages. The significance and outright etymology of the initial syllable of the name is uncertain. Sources in Ojibwe nibiwaki "watery (i.e., swampy) place", Potawatomi pee-wauk-ee-wee-nick "the dusty water" or "lake of shells", and Menominee pee-wau-nau-kee "place of flint" have been suggested, as well as rather less unclear attributed meanings such as "snail lake," "flinty place," and "clean land".

Geography
Pewaukee is located at  (43.082659, -88.252842).

Demographics

2010 census
As of the census of 2010, there were 8,166 people, 3,903 households, and 2,043 families living in the village. The racial makeup of the village was 92.4% White, 1.1% African American, 0.2% Native American, 3.9% Asian, 0.1% Pacific Islander, 1.1% from other races, and 1.2% from two or more races. Hispanic or Latino of any race were 3.5% of the population.

There were 3,903 households, of which 24.9% had children under the age of 18 living with them, 40.0% were married couples living together, 8.8% had a female householder with no husband present, 3.5% had a male householder with no wife present, and 47.7% were non-families. 41.3% of all households were made up of individuals, and 15.8% had someone living alone who was 65 years of age or older. The average household size was 2.08 and the average family size was 2.87.

The median age in the village was 41.4 years. 20.8% of residents were under the age of 18; 6.5% were between the ages of 18 and 24; 27.8% were from 25 to 44; 28.5% were from 45 to 64; and 16.4% were 65 years of age or older. The gender makeup of the village was 47.1% male and 52.9% female.

2000 census
As of the census of 2000, there were 8,170 people, 3,635 households, and 2,079 families living in the village. The population density was 1,986.2 people per square mile (767.5/km2). There were 3,761 housing units at an average density of 914.3/sq mi (353.3/km2). The racial makeup of the village was 96.19% White, 0.58% Black or African American, 0.22% Native American, 1.80% Asian, 0.35% from other races, and 0.86% from two or more races. 1.21% of the population were Hispanic or Latino of any race.

There were 3,635 households, out of which 28.3% had children under the age of 18 living with them, 46.7% were married couples living together, 7.7% had a female householder with no husband present, and 42.8% were non-families. 35.5% of all households were made up of individuals, and 7.6% had someone living alone who was 65 years of age or older. The average household size was 2.19 and the average family size was 2.89.

In the village, the population was spread out, with 22.2% under the age of 18, 7.1% from 18 to 24, 37.3% from 25 to 44, 21.3% from 45 to 64, and 12.1% who were 65 years of age or older. The median age was 36 years. For every 100 females, there were 90.4 males. For every 100 females age 18 and over, there were 86.6 males.

The median income for a household in the village was $53,874, and the median income for a family was $66,940. Males had a median income of $43,284 versus $31,477 for females. The per capita income for the village was $26,656. About 1.2% of families and 2.3% of the population were below the poverty line, including 2.5% of those under age 18 and 3.0% of those age 65 or over.

Business
The village of Pewaukee  is home to one of the three locations of Dynex/Rivett Inc., a manufacturer of hydraulic components and systems. It was also home to Necco Stark, formerly Stark Candy Co. The Pewaukee candy location closed on May 30, 2008. Pewaukee is also the home of Logic Design Corporation, the developers of Global Edge Engineering and Manufacturing Software. Another business located in Pewaukee is PM Plastics, a custom injection molding company.

The village is home to the Old Main Street building on Wisconsin Avenue. Opened in 2002 across from the beach on Pewaukee Lake, Old Main Street replicates the charm of a late 1800s building with modern up to date facilities.  It is the home of small businesses that include restaurants (Seesters and The Chocolate Factory), a salon, a bakery, a pilates/yoga/barre studio, a bead shop, a home builder, a construction management firm, a recruitment firm (Joel Frank & Associates), and a software company (Logic Design Corporation).

Education

Pewaukee School District serves both the village and the city of Pewaukee, Wisconsin.
The district includes four separate buildings all contained in a single-campus environment. The school buildings serve early childhood through 2nd grades, 3rd through 5th, 6th through 8th, and 9th through 12th grades.

WCTC's main campus is located in the village of Pewaukee, Wisconsin. The technical college is part of the 16 technical colleges that make up the Wisconsin Technical College System (WTCS). WCTC has a small but modern campus in Pewaukee within the heart of the lake country area. While Pewaukee is the main campus for WCTC it also has other location sites in Menomonee Falls and Waukesha, as well as about 15 center schools in the Waukesha County area.

See also
 List of villages in Wisconsin

References

External links

 
 Pewaukee School District official site
 Sanborn fire insurance maps: 1894 1899 1914

Villages in Wisconsin
Villages in Waukesha County, Wisconsin